Kim Bong-soo (born November 30, 1962) is a former tennis player from South Korea, who represented his native country at the 1988 Summer Olympics in Seoul where he scored an upset win over the fancied French contender Henri Leconte. There he was defeated in the third round by Argentina's Martín Jaite. The right-hander(with single-handed backhand) reached his highest singles ATP-ranking on December 11, 1989, when he became the number 129 of the world.

External links
 
 
 

1962 births
Living people
South Korean male tennis players
Tennis players at the 1988 Summer Olympics
Olympic tennis players of South Korea
Asian Games medalists in tennis
Tennis players at the 1986 Asian Games
Tennis players at the 1990 Asian Games
Medalists at the 1986 Asian Games
Medalists at the 1990 Asian Games
Asian Games gold medalists for South Korea
Asian Games silver medalists for South Korea
Asian Games bronze medalists for South Korea
Universiade medalists in tennis
Universiade bronze medalists for South Korea
Medalists at the 1985 Summer Universiade
20th-century South Korean people